Élie Marie Gabriel Dor de Lastours (12 August 1874 – 18 November 1932), also known as Élie, Count de Lastours, was a French fencer and tennis player. He competed in the individual épée and men's doubles events at the 1900 Summer Olympics.

References

External links
 

1874 births
1932 deaths
Fencers at the 1900 Summer Olympics
French male épée fencers
French male tennis players
Olympic fencers of France
Olympic tennis players of France
Tennis players at the 1900 Summer Olympics
Sportspeople from Yvelines